Meenaxi: A Tale of Three Cities (or Meenaxi) is a 2004 Hindi film directed by M. F. Husain and starring Tabu, Kunal Kapoor and Raghuvir Yadav. The film is centered on Hyderabad novelist Nawab (Yadav) who is suffering from writer's block. After five years and no stories, Nawab comes across an unconventional muse, Meenaxi (Tabu). The three cities referred to in the title are Hyderabad, Jaisalmer and Prague. The film features an acclaimed score and soundtrack by A.R. Rahman.

It is semi-autobiographical in some respects. There are allusions to Husain's own experiences with his muse, Madhuri Dixit, with whom he made his previous film, Gaja Gamini (2000). The film was screened in the Marché du Film section of the 2005 Cannes Film Festival.

Synopsis 
Nawab, a popular Hyderabadi novelist, is suffering from a classic case of writer's block. Five years have passed, and stories of substance seem to have dried up. Then, almost providentially, Nawab comes across a young woman named Meenaxi. She's enigmatic and individualistic – and not quite willing to perform the part of a passive muse. But that doesn't deter a rejuvenated Nawab from giving her different personae – she can be the mysterious perfume trader of Hyderabad, the exotic desert bloom of Jaisalmer or the orphaned Maria of Prague. Inexorably, she consolidates her command over the novelist. She dismisses his renewed attempts at writing as insubstantial and hackneyed, plunging him into a state of deeper despair. She is scathingly critical about his story and is amused by one of his characters, the lovelorn and awkward Kameshwar. Finally, as Nawab strives on a new page all over again, Meenaxi comments that perhaps the book is in vain. In any case, it is much too late. The writer must survive and live, if he can, without her support, inspiration and criticism.

Cast
 Tabu – Meenaxi
 Kunal Kapoor – Kameshwar Mathur
 Remo D'Souza – Kameshwar's Friend
 Raghuvir Yadav – Nawab
 Nadira Babbar – Khala / Masi

Soundtrack 

A. R. Rahman composed the music on lyrics written by Rahat Indori, M. F. Husain, and Sukhwinder Singh. The music for Meenaxi was released on 24 January 2004 creating great controversies regarding the song "Noor-Un-Ala" which had lyrics directly adapted from the Quran. The soundtrack of the movie got high appreciations from the critics. Rahman composed some of his career best songs for it. The background score was also composed by Rahman. Rahman goes completely into Qawwali rhythms for Hyderabad, a rustic, earthy, Arabic rhythms for Jaisalmer and a rich lavish strings for Prague and brings out the essence and cultures of the three cities through his enticing scores.

The initial lines of "Chinnamma Chilakamma" give a feel of Telugu peppy number, but as Sukhwinder Singh picks up his lines, a Hyderabadi accent is revealed. The lyrics are penned by Sukhwinder Singh. "Rang Hai" is like a rustic mysterious cry of a woman. Alka Yagnik is the main vocalist whilst Lebanese singer Dallinda provided additional vocals. "Dhuan Dhuan" is a sultry and seductive number sung by Asha Bhosle. Additional vocals is by Kunal and percussions by Rahman's usual associate Sivamani. Rahman said about recording of this song at the filmfare: "For one song, we started with no tune and no lyrics either. One afternoon I bumped into Lataji and Ashaji in London. I asked Ashaji if she'd do a song with me the next day. She had to go to Scotland the next day. But she returned in a few days and we finished the track "Dhuan Dhuan" in four hours in London." "Yeh Rishta" is a melody sung by Reena Bhardwaj who has previously worked with Rahman in a chartbuster song for the Tamil movie Baba. It was later reused by Rahman in the Tamil movie Sakkarakatti as "Naan Epodhu" with the same singer which then became a chartbuster. It was picturised as Tabu's solo entrance piece in the film. "Do Kadam" is highly regarded as one of Rahman's best compositions. This song is sung by Sonu Nigam with lyrics provided by Rahat Indori. Planetbollywood referred to this song as the best from Sonu Nigam. The controversial song "Noor-Un-Ala-Noor" is a Sufi style song sung by Murtaza Khan and Qadir Khan, together called Khan brothers. Lyrics for the song were by M. F. Hussain which slightly adapted the Quranic verses honouring Allah to honour the lead character Meenaxi. Husain wrote in The Hindu about this song, "There is a qawwali written by me and sung by classical musicians Ustad Ghulam Mustafa and his son for which Rahman has tuned unusual music. The film opens with this qawwali, the picturisation of which is a major highlight ... The qawwali is exultant about the presence of the light and what a light it is! It is a Sufi thought, a thought that keep us going even when there is pitch darkness."

"Cyclist's Rhythm" and "Potter's Village" were instrumentals composed by Rahman with percussions by Sivamani and flute by Navin Kumar in the former and percussions by Hossam Ramzy and strings by John Themis in the latter.

Track listing

Reception 

The soundtrack for Meenaxi has received positive reviews from critics and fans. Since the film failed at the box office due to controversies created, the soundtrack too remained unnoticed. But the tracks "Yeh Rishta" and "Chinnamma Chillakkamma" were successful when they were reused in the 2008 Tamil movie Sakkarakatti.

Noor-Un-Ala controversy 
The audio was released on 24 January 2004 creating controversy regarding the song "Noor-Un-Ala" which had lyrics directly taken from the Quran. The movie was pulled from cinemas a day after some Muslim organisations raised objections to the song. The All-India Ulema Council complained that the Qawwali song was blasphemous. The council was supported by Muslim organisations like the Milli Council, All-India Muslim Council, Raza Academy, Jamiat-ul-Ulema-e-Hind and Jamat-e-Islami. Husain's son stated that the words were a phrase referring to divine beauty that were being sung for the central character played by Tabu. He said there was no intention to offend. Following the wave of protests the enraged artist pulled his movie from theatres.

Awards
 2003: National Film Awards: Best Production Design:  Sharmishta Roy
 2005: Screen Awards
 Best Cinematography: Santosh Sivan
 2005: Zee Cine Awards
 Best Art Direction: Sharmishta Roy
 Best Cinematography: Santosh Sivan

Notes

External links
 

2000s Hindi-language films
Urdu-language Indian films
2004 films
Films shot in the Czech Republic
Films scored by A. R. Rahman
Films whose production designer won the Best Production Design National Film Award
Films distributed by Yash Raj Films
2000s Urdu-language films